Tristan Jarrett (born August 6, 1998) is an American professional basketball player. He played college basketball for the Kennesaw State Owls, the Three Rivers Raiders, and the Jackson State Tigers.

High school career
Jarrett attended Haywood High School in Brownsville, Tennessee. As a senior, he averaged 21.8 points and 8.6 rebounds per game, leading his team to a Region 8-AA championship. Jarrett was named All-West Tennessee Player of the Year by The Jackson Sun. He committed to playing college basketball for Kennesaw State over scholarship offers from Middle Tennessee, Little Rock and Tennessee State. He was considered a three-star recruit by ESPN.

College career
Jarrett averaged 4.8 points through 12 games at Kennesaw State before leaving the program. He moved to Three Rivers College, where he averaged 29 points as a sophomore and led his team in five statistical categories. He was dismissed from the program for violating team rules. For his junior season, Jarrett transferred to Jackson State. As a junior, he averaged 16.8 points and 3.4 rebounds per game, earning Second Team All-Southwestern Athletic Conference (SWAC) recognition. During a game against Southern on February 8, 2021, Jarrett walked off the court and threw his jersey on his way to the locker room after an argument with teammate Jayveous McKinnis.

At the close of the regular season, Jarrett was named SWAC Player of the Year. He averaged 21.1 points, 5.3 rebounds, and 1.4 steals per game. Following the season, Jarrett declared for the 2021 NBA draft.

Professional career
Jarrett was drafted with the 7th pick in the third round of the 2021 NBA G League Draft by the Raptors 905. He was waived before the season.

Career statistics

College

|-
| style="text-align:left;"| 2017–18
| style="text-align:left;"| Kennesaw State
| 12 || 0 || 12.4 || .304 || .233 || .615 || 2.3 || .7 || .3 || .3 || 4.8
|-
| style="text-align:left;"| 2019–20
| style="text-align:left;"| Jackson State
| 32 || 25 || 27.9 || .390 || .269 || .699 || 3.4 || 1.9 || 1.3 || .5 || 16.8
|-
| style="text-align:left;"| 2020–21
| style="text-align:left;"| Jackson State
| 18 || 16 || 31.8 || .420 || .358 || .842 || 5.3 || 1.4 || 1.4 || .4 || 21.1
|- class="sortbottom"
| style="text-align:center;" colspan="2"| Career
| 62 || 41 || 26.1 || .393 || .298 || .755 || 3.7 || 1.5 || 1.2 || .4 || 15.7

References

External links
Jackson State Tigers bio
Kennesaw State Owls bio

1998 births
Living people
American men's basketball players
Basketball players from Tennessee
Jackson State Tigers basketball players
Kennesaw State Owls men's basketball players
People from Brownsville, Tennessee
Shooting guards